Senator Thompson may refer to:

Members of the United States Senate
Fountain L. Thompson (1854–1942), U.S. Senator from North Dakota from 1909 to 1910
Fred Thompson (1942–2015), U.S. Senator from Tennessee from 1994 to 2003
John Burton Thompson (1810–1874), U.S. Senator from Kentucky from 1853 to 1859
Thomas W. Thompson (1766–1821), U.S. Senator from New Hampshire from 1814 to 1817
William Henry Thompson (1853–1937), U.S. Senator from Nebraska from 1933 to 1934
William Howard Thompson (1871–1928), U.S. Senator from Kansas from 1913 to 1919

United States state senate members
Alan Thompson (Washington politician) (1927–2019), Washington State Senate
Antoine Thompson (born 1970), New York State Senate
Benjamin Thompson (politician) (1798–1852), Massachusetts State Senate
Bruce Thompson (Georgia politician), Georgia State Senate
Carl W. Thompson (1914–2002), Wisconsin State Senate
Charles W. Thompson (Kansas politician) (1867–1950), Kansas State Senate
Charles Winston Thompson (1860–1904), Alabama State Senate
Clark W. Thompson (Minnesota politician) (1825–1885), Minnesota State Senate
Curt Thompson (born 1968), Georgia State Senate
Cyrus Thompson (1855–1930), North Carolina State Senate
Dave Thompson (Minnesota politician) (born 1961), Minnesota State Senate
David P. Thompson (1834–1901), Oregon State Senate
Fletcher Thompson (1925–2022), Georgia State Senate
George F. Thompson (1870–1948), New York State Senate
George L. Thompson (1864–1941), New York State Senate
Geraldine Thompson (born 1948), Florida State Senate
James A. Thompson (New York politician) (1873–1923), New York State Senate
James G. Thompson (New York politician) (1829–?), New York State Senate
Joseph Bryan Thompson (1871–1919), Oklahoma State Senate
Joseph H. Thompson (1871–1928), Pennsylvania State Senate
L. F. Thompson (1827–1894), Washington State Senate
Laforrest H. Thompson (1848–1900), Vermont State Senate
Mike Thompson (California politician) (born 1951), California State Senate
Nancy Thompson (politician) (born 1947), Nebraska State Senate
Richard W. Thompson (1809–1900), Indiana State Senate
Robert F. Thompson (born 1971), Arkansas State Senate
Robert J. Thompson (1937–2006), Pennsylvania State Senate
Roger Thompson (politician) (born 1950s), Oklahoma State Senate
Samuel D. Thompson (born 1935), New Jersey State Senate
Steve Thompson (Georgia politician) (born 1950), Georgia State Senate
Steve Thompson (Louisiana politician) (born 1935), Louisiana State Senate
W. Lair Thompson (1880–1940), Oregon State Senate
Wallace Thompson (1896–1952), Illinois State Senate
Wiley Thompson (1781–1835), Georgia State Senate
William C. Thompson (New York judge) (1924–2018), New York State Senate
William Carrington Thompson (1915–2011), Virginia State Senate
William G. Thompson (1840–1904), Michigan State Senate
William George Thompson (1830–1911), Iowa State Senate
William Thompson (North Carolina politician) (1772–1802), North Carolina State Senate

See also
Senator Thomson (disambiguation)